Beuchel is a tiny, uninhabited island in the Neuendorfer Wiek bay of the German island of Rügen, and is only a little over a hundred metres off Rügen. It measures roughly 400 by 150 metres, and has an area of 7 ha (approx 17. acres). The kidney-shaped island is flat and treeless.

The island was declared a nature reserve in 1940 to protect the birds brooding or resting there, and cannot be visited.

Uninhabited islands of Germany
Nature reserves in Mecklenburg-Western Pomerania
Islands of Mecklenburg-Western Pomerania